Li Xiufu   (born 28 June 1965) is a Chinese footballer who played as a midfielder for the China women's national football team. She was part of the team at the inaugural 1991 FIFA Women's World Cup as the team captain. At the club level, she played for Prima Ham FC in Japan.

References

External links
 

1965 births
Living people
Chinese women's footballers
China women's international footballers
Place of birth missing (living people)
1991 FIFA Women's World Cup players
Women's association football midfielders
Expatriate women's footballers in Japan
Footballers at the 1990 Asian Games
Asian Games gold medalists for China
Asian Games medalists in football
Medalists at the 1990 Asian Games